Shitalasasthi also known as Sital sasthi is celebrated as the marriage of Shiva and Parvati, a major festival of  Utkal Brahmins (commonly called as Odia brahmans) and Aranyaka Brahmins (commonly called as Jhadua brahmans) since ages.
It was started 400 years ago in Sambalpur after the king of Sambalpur brought Utkal Srotriya Vaidika Brahmins from brahmin sasana villages of Puri district. The localities of Nandapada are the oldest of these Brahmins. They first started Sitalsasti Utsav.
This Hindu festival is in the form of a carnival where people and artists from different walks of life participate making it more beautiful and bringing out the true colours of life. Every year it is celebrated towards the end of the summer season (sixth day of the bright fortnight of the month of Jyestha), the aim being to call the rain Gods to give reprieve from the scorching heat of the Sun. During the carnival period, Sambalpur attracts tourists from nearby states and abroad also.

Legend

Sitalsasthi is observed to celebrate the marriage of Gouri and Shankar - as depicted in the Shiva Purana. When Tarakasur was causing terror and devastation all over the world (Swarga, Martiya and Patala), all the Devata's approached Vishnu to find out a solution. Vishnu was undone; as Bramha had bestowed a boon that Tarakasura can only be killed by the son of Shiva. Tarakasura knew it well that after the death of his first wife, Sati (Dakshayani), Shiva was left bereft, withdrew from the world and roamed in the wilderness living a life of austerity and would never have a son; further Shiva was in deep meditation. Vishnu suggested all the Devatas to approach Shakti and request her to take birth as Parvati. On the request of all the Devatas Shakti reincarnate herself as Sati (Parvati) born as the daughter of Himalaya and grew into a supremely beautiful young woman. Narada told many stories of Shiva to Parvati and persuaded her to seek Shiva in marriage. Parvati set in meditation, but even after ages passed Shiva's meditation could not be broken. Again all the Devatas approached Vishnu to solve the problem. Suggested by Vishnu, Kamadeva took his bow and threw a love arrow) at Shiva. Shiva woke up and opened his third eye and burnt Kamadeva as a punishment; since then Kamadeva took the shape of Ananga. But as a result of this Parvati's meditation was fulfilled.

Before the marriage with Parvati, Shiva wanted to test her, to know how deeply she loves him. He incarnated himself as a batu brahmana (Short heighted Brahmin) and told Parvati that, Oh! Parvati, you are young and beautiful, why do you choose to marry an old fellow who lives in smasana (GraveYard), wears tree bark and snakes as ornaments. I know that Maheswara (Shiva) you want to marry, a half naked fellow, looks ugly, no one for sure knows his 'kula' and 'gotra', and how could you ever be happy with such a nomad. Listening to the suggestion of the batu brahman she got angry, and told Oh! Brahmana, ever after reading so much shastras you are still ignorant about Shiva, how foolish you are? I am not bothered whether he is old or young, ugly or handsome I am not marrying him of his handsomeness, I am attracted towards him for his knowledge. I will not accept any one else other than him in marriage. Satisfied with all his test, Shiva appeared in his divine self. On the Jyeshta Shukla paksha Panchami they got married.

Historical evidence
King Ajit Singh son of Chatra Sai of the Chowhan dynasty (1695–1766) ruled Sambalpur. As he was a Vaishnava in his belief & faith and used to spend a considerable amount time at Puri. He wished to establish Sambalpur as a religious place according to the Vaidik line. In the ancient time Saiva Upasak (those who worship Lord Shiva) Brahmins were not present in Sambalpur kingdom. King Ajit Singh requested some Utkal Srotriya Vaidik Brahmin families from Puri to settle at Sambalpur Kingdom.They first settled at Nandapada locality of Sambalpur & Ajitpur Sasan (present day Sasan Village).The king established several temples in the area. Ajit Singh understood that Sambalpur was famous as a Saktipitha in the ancient time, and the union of Shiva and Shakti were worshipped. Dewan Daxina Ray suggested the king to establish and contribute generously to the temples of the Astha Sambhu  in the area. The temple at Huma (The Leaning Temple of Huma) the abode of Lord Vimaleswar the chief amongst the deities of the 'Asta Sambhu’ was already re-built by King Baliar Singh on the ruins of ancient temple built by Ganga Vamsi king Anangabhima Deva-III; later Ajit Singh built seven other temples for the Sambhus. (Kedarnath of Ambabhona, Viswanatha of Deogaon, Balunkeshwar of Gaisama, Mandhata of Maneswar, Swapneshwar of Sorna, Bisweshwara of Soranda and Nilakantheswar of Nilji).

In sasana villages of Puri Sitalsasti & Rukmini Vivah are two most important festival. The Utkal Brahmins established their Ista Dev Lord Balunkeswar at Balibandha, Sambalpur and first started Sitalsasti Jatra under royal patronage. Later Aranyaka Brahmins who were primarily worship Jagannath and follow Vaishnava established Loknath temple at Jhaduapada and started their own Sitalsasti Jatra.

King Ajit Singh patronaged the Sitalsasthi Jatra/Yatra the marriage of Hara and Parvati at Sambalpur on the Jyestha Sukla pakshya Panchami. The God and Goddess are married like human beings. Thal Utha (Beginning), Patarpendi (Nirbandha), Guagunda (Invitation), Ganthla Khula are observed religiously. As during the Ratha Yatra, Jagannath is treated as a Ganadevata, likewise manner Shiva and Parvati are also treated as Ganadevata during this festival.

The ceremony

One nominated family acts as the father and mother of Parvati, and offers the hands of Parvati for marriage with Shiva. Since Shiva is ‘Swayam Bhu’ no one acts as his father and mother.

Shiva starts his marriage procession along with other Gods and Goddesses from his temple. and Nrusingha (Nrisimha) takes charge and leads the procession to the bride's residence. The family of the Goddesses welcome the barat  procession (as we do in our marriages). The idols are kept in a beautifully decorated palanquin, the father and mother and other relatives of Parvati performs the 'Kanyadana' and the marriage is solemnised. The next day the procession returns to the temple (Mandir Pravesh ) with Parvati. Folk dance, folk music, different forms of other dances and music & different floats are the main attraction of this carnival.

Earlier the carnival was organized in two localities of Sambalpur city  i.e., Nandapada and nandapada. Later in 1972 residents of the Mudipada locality  organized another carnival. A Joint Coordination Committee now looks after the complete arrangement for the Carnival. Nowadays the Sitalsasthi carnival could be seen on every street of the city and it has spread to the nearby towns of Bargarh and Jharsuguda. Hence it has become one of the important festivals of Western Odisha.

References

Religious festivals in India
Odia culture
Hindu festivals
Fairs in India
Tourist attractions in Sambalpur
Culture of Sambalpur
Carnivals in India
May observances
June observances